The thirty-first Connecticut House of Representatives district elects one member of the Connecticut House of Representatives. Its current representative is Jill Barry. The district is part of the town of Glastonbury.

List of representatives

Recent elections

References

External links 
 Google Maps – Connecticut House Districts

31